Robert Coyle may refer to:

 Robert Everett Coyle (1930–2012), American judge
 Robert J. Coyle (born 1964), Roman Catholic bishop